James Hamilton (born 7 June 1989) is a snowboarder from New Zealand.

He competed for New Zealand in the men's hornpipe event at the 2010 Winter Olympics at Vancouver.

References

External links 
James Hamilton at the NZOC website

James Hamilton at the FIS website

1989 births
Living people
New Zealand male snowboarders
Olympic snowboarders of New Zealand
Snowboarders at the 2010 Winter Olympics